Boltenhagen (GS09) was a Kondor I-class minesweeper built in East Germany. After the Volksmarine was disbanded just before the reunification of Germany, she was sold to Malta in 1997 and renamed P29 and was used as a patrol boat. After being decommissioned, she was scuttled as a dive site in 2007 off Ċirkewwa.

History

East Germany 
The minesweeper was laid down on 8 October 1969 at Peenewerft shipyard in Wolgast. She was launched on 22 May 1970 and commissioned on 19 September of that same year. She was the eighteenth ship to be built within the Kondor I class, and was named Boltenhagen after the town of the same name in Rostock. She was used to patrol the river banks between East and West Germany, as well as a minesweeper.

Germany 
After the reunification of Germany, the minesweeper was decommissioned along with most of the Kondor I class. However, it was then used as a patrol vessel by the German Federal Coast Guard. The name Boltenhagen was retained but she was given the pennant number BG31. The ship's guns were dismantled, the radio and radar equipment was changed, and it was repainted. BG31, the last Kondor I class in the German Coast Guard, was decommissioned on 30 June 1996.

Malta 
The former minesweeper was then purchased by Malta on 24 July 1997 and was given the pennant number P29. She rejoined her sister ships Ueckermünde and Pasewalk which were purchased by Malta back in 1992 and were given the pennant numbers P30 and P31. P29 became a patrol boat within the Offshore Command of the Maritime Squadron of the Armed Forces of Malta. Since the former minesweepers were purchased unarmed, some light armament was then added by the AFM.

P29 was then used to secure the Maltese coast against smuggling and border control operations. She was decommissioned in 2004 and was bought by the Malta Tourism Authority in September 2005. She was cleaned and then was scuttled on 14 August 2007 off the port of Ċirkewwa to serve as a diving site and artificial reef.

Wreck 
However, since its sinking, Alicia mirabilis, squid, flying gurnards and rays have already started settling on the former patrol boat.

In 2013, P29 was listed among the "10 Most Incredible Sunken Ships on Earth" by Amazing Beautiful World.

See also

References 

Ships sunk as dive sites
Ships built in East Germany
1970 ships
Naval ships of Malta
Ships of the Volksmarine
Cold War minesweepers of Germany
Shipwrecks of Malta
Underwater diving sites in Malta
Mellieħa
Patrol boats
Maritime incidents in 2007